The 2016 Waratah Cup was the 14th season of Football NSW's knockout competition. The Preliminary Rounds are now a part of the 2016 FFA Cup competition. 
The 5 winners from the FFA Cup preliminary Seventh Round qualify for the Waratah Cup, as well as the reigning National Premier Leagues champion (Blacktown City FC).

The Cup was won by the defending champions Sydney United 58, their 6th title.

Preliminary rounds

New South Wales clubs, other than Northern NSW and A-League clubs, participate in the FFA Cup via the preliminary rounds. The competition is for all Senior Men's teams of the National Premier Leagues NSW, NPL 2, NPL 3, NSW State League, as well as Association teams which applied to participate.

A total of 130 clubs entered into the competition, and the five qualifiers to join Blacktown City FC in the final rounds are:

Playoff round 

Four of the qualifiers played off to reduce the remaining teams to 4, with Manly United and Sydney United 58 receiving a Bye until the semi-finals.

Semi finals

A total of 4 teams took part in this stage of the competition.

Grand final

References

Waratah Cup
Waratah Cup